Alain Faubert (born 4 April 1965) is a Canadian bishop of the Roman Catholic Church. He was appointed by Pope Francis in 2016 as Auxiliary Bishop of the Archdiocese of Montreal and consecrated on 15 June 2016 at Mary, Queen of the World Cathedral.

References

External links

1965 births
Living people
21st-century Roman Catholic bishops in Canada
Université Laval alumni